Baliochila congdoni is a butterfly in the family Lycaenidae. It is found in north-eastern Tanzania. Its habitat consists of submontane forests.

The length of the forewings is about 13.1 mm. The upperside ground colour is pale yellow. The outer border and costa of the forewings are widely blackish brown, while the lower discal area and hind margin are pale yellow. The hindwings are pale yellow from the base to the wide outer blackish-brown border.

References

Butterflies described in 1990
Poritiinae
Endemic fauna of Tanzania
Butterflies of Africa